Sosan Aaron Michael Kyomya is the bishop of the Anglican diocese of Busoga in Uganda. He was previously academic dean at the Nairobi International School of Theology (NIST) in Kenya. In 1995 Kyomya and his wife, Florence, founded Hesed Ministries, Uganda, which aims to help women build confidence through Christian living.

In 2010 he wrote A Guide to Interpreting Scripture published by Hippo Books, an imprint of WordAlive Publishers and Zondervan.

References

External links
 Zondervan

Living people
Ugandan Anglicans
Ugandan educators
Ugandan writers
Year of birth missing (living people)
People educated at Kiira College Butiki